Ibrány is a town in Szabolcs-Szatmár-Bereg county, in the Northern Great Plain region of eastern Hungary.

Geography

Twin towns – sister cities

Ibrány is twinned with:
 Głogów Małopolski, Poland  
 Gornești, Romania
 Gradisca d'Isonzo, Italy  
 Krásnohorská Dlhá Lúka, Slovakia

References

External links 

  in Hungarian

Populated places in Szabolcs-Szatmár-Bereg County